The National Capital Region Police Office (NCRPO) is a division of the Philippine National Police (PNP) that has jurisdiction over Metro Manila, also known as the National Capital Region. It is headquartered in Camp Bagong Diwa.

History

As PC METROCOM

The Philippine National Police - National Capital Region Police Office (PNP NCRPO) was established as the Philippine Constabulary Metropolitan Command (PC METROCOM) on July 5, 1967, through Executive Order No. 85 of then President Ferdinand Marcos. It was founded as the Special Strike Force of Police Forces in the area which would later be known as Metro Manila. The establishment was a response to the increase of criminality in then existing four cities and thirteen municipalities in the area.

The METROCOM was tasked to conduct operations against threats to national security in the Metropolitan Manila area as well as support to the local police forces of the localities in their suppression and prevention of crime. The Metropolitan Police Force was later established on March 21, 1974, through Presidential Decre No. 421 issued by then-President Ferdinand Marcos. The decree consolidates the police, jail, and fire departments in the Metropolitan Manila area and placed them under the Commanding General of the METROCOM which served as head of the unit.

As PC Capital Region Command
Following the People Power Revolution of February 1986 which ousted Marcos as president, the PC METROCOM was renamed as the Philippine Constubulary Capital Region Command (PC CAPCOM). The Philippine Constubulary (PC) itself would be abolished through Republic Act 6975. issued by then President Corazon Aquino in December 1990. The Philippine National Police (PNP) was established as in PC's place. Under the Republic Act 6975, two regional offices were created for Metro Manila, North CAPCOM and South CAPCOM. These offices were deactivated on April 12, 1993.

As PNP NCRC and PNP NCRPO
In 1994, the PNP CAPCOM was renamed as the National Capital Region Command (PNP NCRC) and was renamed again in June 1996 to its current name, the PNP National Capital Region Police Office (PNP NCRPO) through NAPOLCOM Resolution No. 96-058. In early 1999, the PNP NCRPO launched its first website ("metromanilapolice.info.com.ph").

Divisions

District Offices
The PNP NCRPO has five police districts under it. Among the localities in Metro Manila, Manila and Quezon City are the only localities to have a dedicated police district.

Regional Headquarters Command Group
Office of the Regional Director
Office of the Deputy Regional Director for Administration
Office of the Deputy Regional Director for Operations
Regional Directorial Staff
Secretary to the Directorial Staff
Office of the Spokesperson

Regional Directorial Staff
Regional Personnel and Records Management Division 
Regional Intelligence Division
Regional Operations Division 
Regional Logistics and Research Development Division 
Regional Community Affairs and Development Division 
Regional Comptrollership Division 
Regional Investigation and Detective Management Division
Regional Learning and Doctrine Development Division
Regional Plans and Strategy Management Division 
Regional Information and Communications Technology Management Division 
Regional Public Information Office
Regional Executive Senior Police Office
Regional Mobile Force Battalion 
Regional Headquarters Support Unit 
Regional Personnel Holding and Accounting Unit 
Presidential PNP Security Force Unit

Support Units
Regional Highway Patrol Unit, NCRPO
Regional Forensic Unit, NCRPO
Regional Criminal Investigation and Detection Unit, NCRPO
Regional Special Operations Unit
Regional Anti-Carnapping Unit
Regional Drug Enforcement Unit
Regional Complaints Referral and Monitoring Center
Regional Special Operating Unit
Regional Tactical Operations and Intelligence Center
Regional Internal Affairs Service, NCRPO
Regional Medical and Dental Unit, NCRPO 
Regional Finance Service Office 16, NCRPO
Regional Chaplain Service, NCRPO
Regional Communications and Electronics Unit, NCRPO
Regional Engineering Unit, NCRPO 
Regional Legal Service, NCRPO
Regional Special Training Unit, NCRPO 
Regional Aviation Security Unit, NCRPO 
Regional Maritime Unit, NCRPO 
NCR Training Center

List of Regional Director
{| class="wikitable sortable"
|-
!Name
!Term
!Former Position
!New Position
|-
|align=center|Carmelo Valmoria
|December 11, 2013 - July 15, 2015
|
|
|-
|align=center|Joel Pagdilao
|July 29, 2015 - July 3, 2016
|District Director, QCPD
|
|-
|align=center|Oscar Albayalde
|July 4, 2016 - April 19, 2018
|Deputy Director, PNP Directorate for Plans
|promoted as PNP Chief
|-
|align=center|Camilo Cascolan
|April 19, 2018 - June 1, 2018
|Director, Directorate for Operations
|reassign as Director for PNP Civil Security Group
|-
|align=center|Guillermo Eleazar
|June 1, 2018 - October 16, 2019
|Regional Director, PRO-4A
|promoted as Chief of Directorial Staff
|-
|align=center|Debold Sinas
|October 16, 2019 – November 10, 2020
|Regional Director, PRO-7
|promoted as PNP Chief
|-
|align=center|Vicente Danao
|November 10, 2020 – March 1, 2022
|Regional Director, PRO-4A
|promoted as Chief of Directorial Staff
|-
|align=center|Felipe R. Natividad
|March 1, 2022 – August 8, 2022
|Director, PNP Special Action Force
|promoted as Commander of Area Police Command, Northern Luzon
|-
|align=center|Jonnel C. Estomo
|August 8, 2022 – February 23,2023
|Regional Director, PRO-5
|promoted as Deputy Chief for Operations 
|align=center|PMGEN Edgar Allan O.Okubo
|February 23,2023-Present
|Director,Special Action Force

Controversies

Mañanita during the COVID-19 pandemic
The holding of a mañanita for NCRPO's chief Debold Sinas amidst the COVID-19 pandemic in Metro Manila was criticized for breaching quarantine regulations. A mañanita is a customary celebration in the police where senior officers are greeted by their personnel in the early morning of their birthdays. The national police has filed charges against Sinas over the event, for violation of existing regulations on social distancing and mass gatherings though Sinas keeps his post due to "emergency situation" caused by the pandemic.

References

Regional offices of the Philippine National Police
Law enforcement in Metro Manila